David McCullagh (born 1 December 1967) is an Irish journalist, author and presenter with Raidió Teilifís Éireann (RTÉ), Ireland's national radio and television station, where he has presented the Six One News, alongside Caitríona Perry, since August 2020. He previously presented current affairs television programme Prime Time from 2013 to 2020, and was Political Correspondent with RTÉ News and Current Affairs.

Career
He began his journalistic career working for the Evening Press. In 2001, he was Political Correspondent with Raidió Teilifís Éireann, along with David Davin-Power. He presents Behind Closed Doors on RTÉ One which details released State Documents. He has also presented The Week in Politics and election and referendum programmes on RTÉ. He was appointed to present the current affairs programme, Prime Time, in September 2013.

In 1999, he won a prize under the category 'TV features and documentaries' in the ESB national media awards. He has also written the book A Makeshift Majority: The first inter-party government, 1948-51, and a biography of  John A. Costello. The Reluctant Taoiseach: A Biography of John A Costello, was launched in 2010.

On 31 August 2020, McCullagh began presenting the Six One News alongside Caitríona Perry.

During the 2022 Russian invasion of Ukraine, McCullagh interviewed the Russian ambassador to Ireland Yury Anatoliyevich Filatov on RTÉ News: Six One, asking him pointed questions about Russia's deception prior to the invasion and the unprovoked, aggressive nature of the invasion. The interview was widely praised in pro-NATO circles. 

In September 2022, McCullagh was named as one of four presenters to host Monday Night Live, a new eight-part current affairs panel series on RTÉ One, beginning on 3 October.

Personal life
McCullagh attended Newpark Comprehensive School and studied politics in University College Dublin. He holds a PhD in the subject.

McCullagh is married to journalist Anne-Marie Smyth; they have one daughter, Rosie.

References 

1967 births
Living people
RTÉ newsreaders and journalists
Prime Time (Irish TV programme) presenters
Alumni of University College Dublin